Mount Lesueur is a near-circular, flat-topped mesa located  from Jurien Bay in Western Australia. It rises above the surrounding lateritic plain of Lesueur National Park which has eroded away around it.

Mount Lesueur  was first sighted and named by Europeans as the French ship the Naturaliste sailed past Jurien Bay on its voyage up the Western Australian coast. It was named in honour of Charles Alexander Lesueur, a natural history artist on board the ship. The next recorded sighting was by Captain George Grey, who led a small party through the area in 1839 after they were shipwrecked near Kalbarri. 
In 1849 a party led by A.C. Gregory ascended Mount Lesueur. They were followed the next year by botanical collector James Drummond on the first of his many visits to the area.

A reserve (No.24275) was created around Mount Lesueur for "educational purposes" in the 1950s. A more extensive area was gazetted as a national park in 1992.

Mount Lesueur has an extremely high level of plant biodiversity, making it of immense research and conservation importance to botanists.

References

Lesueur
Wheatbelt (Western Australia)